Roccat Browser is a web browser designed for macOS and iOS, developed and released by Runecats. It utilises the Webkit rendering engine.

Features
Roccat Browser includes features such as "Roccat Draw", which allows the user to annotate webpages from within the browser, and "Resource Saver", which disables and re-enables web plugins such as Adobe Flash Player, reducing processing power and increasing battery life. "Roccat Flick" allows the user to share websites over a network, to other Macs, iPhones or iPads.

Roccat Browser also runs on a cloud system called RClouds which lets you backup your tabs, bookmarks, settings and all things related to your browser, Roccat also provides a unique tab system which displays a preview of the website within each tab, this tab bar can be moved from the top to the bottom, either side or can be placed in a drawer.

System requirements

Mobile versions
Roccat is also available on iOS devices, such as the iPad and iPhone. The mobile version features many of the same features as its desktop counterpart.

Release history

References

Macintosh web browsers
macOS web browsers
iOS web browsers
Software based on WebKit